Zhonghua minzu is a political term in modern Chinese nationalism related to the concepts of nation-building, ethnicity, and race in the Chinese nationality.

Zhonghua minzu was established during the early Beiyang (1912–1927) and Nationalist (1928–1949) periods to include Han people and four major non-Han ethnic groups: the Man (Manchus), the Meng (Mongols), the Hui (ethnic groups of Islamic faith in Northwest China), and the Zang (Tibetans), under the notion of a republic of five races ( or Wǔzú gònghé) advocated by Sun Yat-sen and the Chinese Nationalist Party. It is slightly different from the word Hanzu, a word is only used to refer to the Han Chinese.

Zhonghua minzu was initially rejected in the People's Republic of China (PRC) but resurrected after Mao Zedong's death to include the mainstream Han Chinese and 55 other ethnic groups as a huge Chinese family. Since the late 1980s, the most fundamental change of the PRC's nationalities and minorities policies is the renaming from "the Chinese People" ( or Zhōngguó rénmín) to "the Chinese Nation" (Zhōnghuá mínzú), signalling a shift away from a multi-national communist people's statehood of China to one multi-ethnic Chinese nation state with one single Chinese national identity.

History 

An older similar term would be Huaxia, but the immediate roots of the Zhonghua minzu lie in the Qing dynasty founded by the Manchu clan Aisin Gioro in what is today Northeast China. The Qing Emperors sought to portray themselves as ideal Confucian rulers for the Han Chinese, Great Khans for the Mongols, and Chakravartin kings for Tibetan Buddhists.

"Dulimbai Gurun" (Written ) is the Manchu name for China. It has the same meaning as the Chinese name "Zhongguo" (written 中國, meaning "Middle Kingdom"). The Qing identified their state as "China" (Zhongguo), and referred to it as "Dulimbai Gurun" in Manchu. The Qing equated the lands of the Qing state, including present day Manchuria, Xinjiang, Mongolia, Tibet and other areas as "China" in both the Chinese and Manchu languages, defining China as a multi ethnic state, rejecting the idea that China only meant Han areas, proclaiming that both Han and non-Han peoples were part of "China", using "China" to refer to the Qing in official documents, international treaties, and foreign affairs, and the "Chinese language" (Dulimbai gurun i bithe) referred to Chinese, Manchu, and Mongol languages, and the term "Chinese people" (中國之人 Zhongguo zhi ren;  Dulimbai gurun-i niyalma) referred to all Han, Manchu, and Mongol subjects of the Qing.

When the Qing conquered Dzungaria in 1759, they proclaimed that the new land was absorbed into "China" (Dulimbai Gurun) in a Manchu language memorial. The Qing expounded on their ideology that they were bringing together the "outer" non-Han Chinese like the Inner Mongols, Eastern Mongols, Oirat Mongols, and Tibetans together with the "inner" Han Chinese, into "one family" united in the Qing state, showing that the diverse subjects of the Qing were all part of one family, the Qing used the phrase "Zhongwai yijia" (中外一家) or "neiwai yijia" (內外一家, "interior and exterior as one family"), to convey this idea of "unification" of the different peoples. A Manchu language version of a treaty with the Russian Empire concerning criminal jurisdiction over bandits called people from the Qing as "people of the Central Kingdom (Dulimbai Gurun)". In the Manchu official Tulisen's Manchu language account of his meeting with the Torghut Mongol leader Ayuki Khan, it was mentioned that while the Torghuts were unlike the Russians, the  "people of the Central Kingdom" (dulimba-i gurun 中國, Zhongguo) were like the Torghut Mongols, and the "people of the Central Kingdom" referred to the Manchus.

Before the rise of nationalism people were generally loyal to the city-state, the feudal fief and its lord or, in the case of China, to the dynastic state. The French Revolution and subsequent developments in Europe paved the way for the modern nation-state and nationalism has become one of the most significant political and social forces in history. Nationalism spread in the early 19th century to central Europe and from there to eastern and southeastern Europe and in the early 20th century nationalism began to appear in China.

While Qing rulers adopted the Han Chinese imperial model and considered their state as Zhongguo ("中國", the term for "China" in modern Chinese), and the name "China" was commonly used in international communications and treaties (such as the Treaty of Nanking), domestically however, some Chinese nationalists such as Sun Yat-sen initially described the Manchus as "foreign invaders" to be expelled, and planned to establish a Han nation-state modelled closely after Germany and Japan.  Fearing, however, that this restrictive view of the ethnic nation-state would result in the loss of large parts of imperial territory, Chinese nationalists discarded this concept. The abdication of the Qing emperor inevitably led to controversy about the status of territories in Tibet and Mongolia. While the emperor formally bequeathed all the Qing territories to the new republic, it was the position of Mongols and Tibetans that their allegiance had been to the Qing monarch; with the abdication of the Qing, they owed no allegiance to the new Chinese state. This was rejected by the Republic of China and subsequently the People's Republic of China.

This development in Chinese thinking was mirrored in the expansion of the meaning of the term Zhonghua minzu. Originally coined by the late Qing philologist Liang Qichao, Zhonghua minzu initially referred only to the Han Chinese. It was then expanded to include the Five Races Under One Union, based on the ethnic categories of the Qing.

Sun Yat-sen further expanded this concept when he wrote,

The concept of Zhonghua minzu was first publicly espoused by President Yuan Shikai in 1912, shortly after the overthrow of the Qing Dynasty and the founding of the Republic of China.  Facing the imminent independence of Outer Mongolia from China, Yuan Shikai stated, "Outer Mongolia is part of Zhonghua minzu [the Chinese nation] and has been of one family for centuries".

After the founding of the People's Republic of China, the concept of Zhonghua minzu became influenced by Soviet nationalities policy.  Officially, the PRC is a unitary state composed of 56 ethnic groups, of which the Han ethnic group is by far the largest.  The concept of Zhonghua minzu is seen as an all-encompassing category consisting of people within the borders of the PRC.

This term has continued to be invoked and remains a powerful concept in China into the 21st century. In mainland China, it continues to hold use as the leaders of China need to unify into one political entity a highly diverse set of ethnic and social groups as well as to mobilize the support of overseas Chinese in developing China. The term is included in article 22 of the Regulations on United Front Work of the Communist Party of China: "...promote national unity and progress, and enhance the identification of the masses of all ethnic groups with the great motherland, the Chinese nation, Chinese culture, the Communist Party of China, and socialism with Chinese characteristics." Zhonghua minzu is also one of the "five identifications".

In Taiwan it has been invoked by President Ma as a unifying concept that includes the people of both Taiwan and mainland China without a possible interpretation that Taiwan is part the People's Republic of China, whereas terms such as "Chinese people" can be, given that the PRC is commonly known as "China".

Implications
The adoption of the Zhonghua minzu concept may give rise to the reinterpretation of Chinese history. For example, the Manchu-founded Qing dynasty was originally sometimes characterized as a "conquest dynasty" or a "non-Han" regime. Following the adoption of the Zhonghua minzu ideology, which regards the Manchus as a member of the Zhonghua minzu, dynasties founded by ethnic minorities are no longer stigmatized.

The concept of Zhonghua minzu nevertheless also leads to the reassessment of the role of many traditional hero figures. Heroes such as Yue Fei and Zheng Chenggong, who were originally often considered to have fought for China against barbarian incursions, have been recharacterized by some as minzu yingxiong (ethnic heroes) who fought not against barbarians but against other members of the Zhonghua minzu (the Jurchens and Manchus respectively). At the same time, China exemplified heroes such as Genghis Khan, who became a "national hero" as a member of the Zhonghua minzu.

The Zhonghua Minzu concept in practice gives Chinese nationals who are not of the ethnic Han majority preferential university entry status, favorable tax laws, non-compliance with the one-child policy, among other preferential conditions under Chinese law for ethnic minorities.

Ambiguity

The theory behind the ideology of Zhonghua minzu is that it includes not only the Han but also other minority ethnic groups within China, such as the Mongols, Manchus, Hmong, Tibetans, Tuvans, etc. An ethnic Korean from China living and working in Korea or an ethnic Mongol from China living and working in Mongolia would both be considered members of the Zhonghua minzu, which can give rise to potential issues (including loyalty to contemporary nation-states, the proper boundary lines between states/subnational entities, and the modern categorization of historical states) of identity.

Whether ethnic Han living overseas and not having Chinese citizenship are considered part of this Chinese nationality depends on the speaker and the context. More often than not, overseas Chinese in Indonesia, Malaysia and Singapore make a clear distinction between being Chinese in a political sense and being Chinese in an ethnic sense, making it unclear whether or not they belong to such a group that contains both political and ethnic connotations.

The conceptual boundaries of the Zhonghua minzu may be complicated by the politics of neighboring countries such as Mongolia, North Korea and South Korea, who exclusively claim regional historical peoples and states. For instance, the idea of Genghis Khan as a "national hero" is contested by Mongolia, which since the fall of socialism has explicitly positioned Genghis Khan as the father of the Mongolian state. In opposition to this, it is common to point out that there are more ethnic Mongols in China than in the state of Mongolia. Moreover, the modern-day state of Mongolia acquired its independence from the Republic of China which had obtained the legal right to inherit all Qing territories, including Mongolia, through the Imperial Edict of the Abdication of the Qing Emperor.

A dispute of a similar nature has arisen over the status of the state of Goguryeo (Gaogouli) in ancient history, with China claiming it as Chinese on the grounds that much of it existed within the current borders of China as well as the ancient borders of China. On that basis Chinese nationalists maintain that these territories belong to the heterogeneous origin of the Chinese nation.

See also 

 China proper
 Chinese nationalism
 Descendants of the Dragon
 Ethnic minorities in China
 Sinicization
 Sinocentrism
 Three Principles of the People
 Volk
 Yan Huang Zisun

Notes

References

Citations

Sources
 Works cited

External links 
 The War of Words Between South Korea and China Over An Ancient Kingdom: Why Both Sides Are Misguided Zhonghua minzu and the Sino-Korean controversy over the 'ownership' of ancient Koguryo.
 Sinicization vs. Manchuness: The Success of Manchu Rule 

Chinese culture
Chinese nationalism
Chinese words and phrases
Ideology of the Kuomintang
National identities